The 2015–16 season was Middlesbrough's seventh consecutive season in the Football League Championship in their 140th year in existence. Along with the Championship, the club also competed in the FA Cup and Football League Cup. The season covers the period from 1 July 2015 to 30 June 2016.

Statistics

Appearances and goals
Last updated 12 July 2016
"+" constitutes substitute appearances

|-
|colspan="14"|Players who appeared for Middlesbrough but left during the season:

|}

Top scorers
Last updated 12 July 2016

Disciplinary record

Transfers

Transfers in

Transfers out

Loans in

Loans out

Competitions

Pre-season friendlies
On 8 June 2015, Middlesbrough announced two friendlies against York City and Doncaster Rovers. A trip to Barnsley on 29 July was later announced. On 8 July, Boro announced Spanish side Getafe will visit a week prior to the opening game of the season.

Championship

League table

League results summary

Matches

On 17 June 2015, the fixtures for the forthcoming season were announced.

FA Cup

League Cup
On 16 June 2015, the first round draw was made, Middlesbrough were drawn away against Oldham Athletic. In the second round, Middlesbrough were drawn away to Burton Albion. The third round draw was made on 25 August 2015 live on Sky Sports by Charlie Nicholas and Phil Thompson. Middlesbrough were drawn at home to Wolverhampton Wanderers.

References

2015-16
Middlesbrough